James Allen Graham, (April 27, 1921 – November 20, 2003) was an American teacher and politician who served as the thirteenth North Carolina Commissioner of Agriculture.

Early life
Graham was born on April 7, 1921 to James Turner and Laura Blanche Allen Graham in Cleveland, North Carolina.  Graham was raised in Rowan County, North Carolina on a 250-acre farm where the family raised cotton, cattle and grain.

Education
Graham graduated from Cleveland High School in 1938, where he played on the High School football team. In 1942 Graham graduated with a Bachelor of Science in Agricultural Education from North Carolina State College where he was a member of Tau Kappa Epsilon fraternity.

Family life
Jim Graham married Helen Ida Kirk, on October 30, 1942, they had two daughters, Alice Kirk Graham, and Laura Constance Graham.

Commissioner of Agriculture
On July 19, 1964 Graham was appointed North Carolina Commissioner of Agriculture, by Governor Terry Sanford, to fill the unexpired term of the late Lynton Y. Ballentine. Graham was elected Commissioner of Agriculture in November 1964 and reelected eight times.

Writings
 Graham, James A.:  The Sodfather: A Friend of Agriculture, (1998).

References

External links
N.C. Agricultural Hall of Fame Inductees.
Guide to the NC State University Libraries Collection about Jim Graham 1940-2000
NCSU Libraries Special Collections

1921 births
2003 deaths
North Carolina Commissioners of Agriculture
North Carolina State University alumni
People from Cleveland, North Carolina
North Carolina Democrats
20th-century American politicians